Citizens National Bank was a historic bank building located at Parkersburg, Wood County, West Virginia.  It was built in 1898, and was a five-story, nine bay by three bay, masonry building in the Classical style. It featured a combination of arches, applied pressed metal ornamentation, and during its latter years, in the shadows of missing hollow metal, broken pediments.

It was listed on the National Register of Historic Places in 1982. The historic structure was demolished on June 23, 2018.

References

Bank buildings on the National Register of Historic Places in West Virginia
Commercial buildings completed in 1898
Neoclassical architecture in West Virginia
Buildings and structures in Parkersburg, West Virginia
National Register of Historic Places in Wood County, West Virginia
1898 establishments in West Virginia
Buildings and structures demolished in 2018
Former bank buildings
Demolished buildings and structures in West Virginia
2018 disestablishments in West Virginia